UMW may refer to:

 UMW Holdings
 UMW Toyota Motor (Malaysia)
 United Mine Workers, coal miners' union in U.S.
 University of Mary Washington
 University of Minnesota Waseca
 University of Montana Western
 University-Mount Wellington, New Zealand football club
 United Methodist Women